The Gearing class was a series of 98 destroyers built for the U.S. Navy during and shortly after World War II.

The first Gearings were not ready for service until mid-1945 and saw little service in World War II. They continued serving, with a series of upgrades, until the 1970s. At that time many were sold to other nations, where they served many more years.

Procurement and construction 
31 vessels were authorized on 9 July 1942:
 DD-710 to DD-721 awarded to Federal Shipbuilding, Kearny.
 DD-742 to DD-743 awarded to Bath Iron Works, Bath, Maine.
 DD-763 to DD-769 awarded to Bethlehem Steel, San Francisco.
 DD-782 to DD-791 awarded to Todd Pacific Shipyards, Seattle.

4 vessels were authorized on 13 May 1942:
 DD-805 to DD-808 awarded to Bath Iron Works, Bath, Maine.

3 vessels were authorized on 27 March 1943 under the Vinson–Trammell Act:
 DD-809 to DD-811 awarded to Bath Iron Works, Bath, Maine. (later cancelled)

114 vessels were authorized on 19 July 1943 under the 70% Expansion Act:
 DD-812 awarded to Bath Iron Works, Bath, Maine. (later cancelled)
 DD-813 to DD-814 awarded to Bethlehem Steel, Staten Island. (later cancelled)
 DD-815 to DD-825 awarded to Consolidated Steel, Orange. (815 and 816 later cancelled)
 DD-826 to DD-849 awarded to Bath Iron Works, Bath, Maine.
 DD-850 to DD-853 awarded to Bethlehem Steel, Fore River Shipyard, Quincy.
 DD-854 to DD-856 awarded to Bethlehem Steel, Staten Island. (later cancelled)
 DD-858 to DD-861 awarded to Bethlehem Steel, San Pedro.
 DD-862 to DD-872 awarded to Bethlehem Steel, Staten Island.
 DD-873 to DD-890 awarded to Consolidated Steel, Orange.
 DD-891 to DD-893 awarded to Federal Shipbuilding, Kearny.  (later cancelled)
 DD-894 to DD-895 awarded to Consolidated Steel, Orange.  (later cancelled)
 DD-896 to DD-904 awarded to Bath Iron Works, Bath, Maine.  (later cancelled)
 DD-905 to DD-908 awarded to Boston Navy Yard. (later cancelled)
 DD-909 to DD-916 awarded to Bethlehem Steel, Staten Island.  (later cancelled)
 DD-917 to DD-924 awarded to Consolidated Steel, Orange. (later cancelled)
 DD-925 to DD-926 awarded to Charleston Navy Yard.  (later cancelled)

(Of the missing numbers in this sequence - 722 to 741, 744 to 762, 770 to 781, and 857 were allocated to orders for s; 792 to 804 were awarded to orders for s.)

Cancelled vessels 
In March 1945, the orders for 36 of the above vessels were cancelled, and 11 more orders were cancelled in August 1945. Following the close of World War II, 7 further vessels were cancelled in 1946: 
They were sold on 29 August 1955, and scrapped.
Their bows were used to repair other destroyers, and their remains were scrapped in 1958-1959.
 , built by Todd Pacific Shipyards at Seattle; partially completed. Put in reserve on 25 June 1946, sold 12 September 1961, scrapped 22 September 1961.
 Four unnamed vessels (DD-809 to DD-812) awarded to Bath Iron Works, and five others (DD-813, DD-814, and DD-854 to DD-856) awarded to Bethlehem at Staten Island, were cancelled on 12 August 1945.
 Charles H. Roan (DD-815) and Timmerman (DD-816), both awarded to Consolidated Steel Corporation at Orange, were also cancelled on 12 August 1945.
 Three more unnamed vessels (DD-891 to DD-893) awarded to Federal Shipbuilding at Kearney, were cancelled 8 March 1945.
 Ten more unnamed vessels (DD-894, DD-895, and DD-917 to DD-924) awarded to Consolidated Steel Corporation at Orange, and four more (DD-905 to DD-908) awarded to Boston Navy Yard, and another two (DD-925 and DD-926) awarded to Charleston Navy Yard, were all cancelled on 27 March 1945.
 Nine more unnamed vessels (DD-896 to DD-904) awarded to Bath Iron Works, and another eight (DD-909 to DD-916) awarded to Bethlehem at Staten Island, were all cancelled on 28 March 1945.

Design
The first ship was laid down in August 1944, while the last was launched in March 1946. In that time the United States produced 98 Gearing-class destroyers.  The Gearing class was a seemingly minor improvement of the Allen M. Sumner class, built from 1943 until 1945. The main differences were that the Gearings were  longer in the midship section, allowing for increased fuel tankage for greater range, an important consideration in Pacific War. More importantly in the long run, the increased size of the Gearings made them much more suitable for upgrades than the Allen M. Sumners, as seen in the wartime radar picket subclass, the 1950s radar picket destroyer (DDR) and escort destroyer (DDE) conversions, and the Fleet Rehabilitation and Modernization (FRAM) conversions 1960-1965. As designed, the Gearing class's armament was identical to that on the Allen M. Sumner class. Three twin /38 caliber Mark 38 dual purpose (DP) mounts constituted the main battery. The 5-inch guns were guided by a Mark 37 Gun Fire Control System with a Mark 25 fire control radar linked by a Mark 1A Fire Control Computer stabilized by a Mark 6 8,500 rpm gyro. This fire control system provided effective long-range anti-aircraft (AA) or anti-surface fire.  Twelve  Bofors guns in two quad and two twin mounts and 11  Oerlikon cannons in single mounts were also equipped. The initial design retained the Allen M. Sumner class's heavy torpedo armament of ten  torpedo tubes in two quintuple mounts, firing the Mark 15 torpedo. As the threat from kamikaze aircraft mounted in 1945, and with few remaining Japanese warships to use torpedoes on, most of the class had the aft quintuple 21-inch tube mounts replaced by an additional 40 mm quadruple mount (prior to completion on later ships) for 16 total 40 mm guns. Twenty-four ships (DD-742, DD743, 805-808, 829, 831-835, and 874-883) were ordered without torpedo tubes to allow for radar picket equipment; these were redesignated as DDRs in 1948.

1946-1959 upgrades

Following World War II most of the class had their AA and anti-submarine warfare (ASW) armament upgraded. The 40 mm and 20 mm guns were replaced by two to six /50 caliber guns in up to two twin and two single mountings. One depth charge rack was removed and two Hedgehog ASW mortar mounts added. The K-guns were retained. Nine additional (for a total of 35) ships were converted to radar picket destroyers (DDR) in the early 1950s; these typically received only one 3-inch twin mount to save weight for radar equipment, as did the wartime radar pickets. Nine ships were converted to escort destroyers (DDE), emphasizing ASW.  was the most thorough DDE conversion, with 4 3-inch/70 caliber guns in twin enclosed mounts, two Weapon Alpha launchers, four new 21-inch torpedo tubes for the Mark 37 ASW torpedo, and one depth charge rack.

FRAM I upgrade 

In the late 1950s and early 1960s, 79 of the Gearing-class destroyers underwent extensive modernization overhauls, known as FRAM I, which were designed under project SCB 206 to convert them from an anti-aircraft destroyer to an anti-submarine warfare platform. FRAM I removed all of the DDR and DDE equipment, and these ships were redesignated as DDs. FRAM I and FRAM II conversions were completed 1960-1965. Eventually all but three Gearings received FRAM conversions.

The FRAM I program was an extensive conversion for the Gearing-class destroyers. This upgrade included rebuilding the ship's superstructure, electronic systems, radar, sonar, and weapons. The second twin 5-inch gun mount and all previous AA guns and ASW equipment were removed. On several ships the two forward 5-inch mounts remained and the aft 5-inch mount was removed. Upgraded systems included SQS-23 sonar, SPS-10 surface search radar, two triple Mark 32 torpedo tubes, an 8-cell Anti-Submarine Rocket (ASROC) box launcher, and one QH-50C DASH ASW drone helicopter, with its own landing pad and hangar. Both the Mk 32 torpedo tubes and ASROC launched Mk. 44 homing ASW torpedoes. ASROC could also launch a nuclear depth charge. On 11 May 1962,  tested a live nuclear ASROC in the "Swordfish" test.

In Navy slang, the modified destroyers were called "FRAM cans", "can" being a contraction of "tin can", the slang term for a destroyer or destroyer escort.

The Gyrodyne QH-50C DASH was an unmanned anti-submarine helicopter, controlled remotely from the ship. The drone could carry two Mark 44 homing ASW torpedoes. However, DASH proved unreliable in shipboard service, with over half of the USN's 746 drones lost at sea. This was possibly due to inadequate maintenance support, as other services had few difficulties with DASH. By 1970, DASH had been withdrawn from FRAM I ships, though it was retained into the early 1970s on FRAM II ships, which lacked ASROC. A limitation of drones in ASW was the need to re-acquire the target at ranges beyond the effectiveness of the controlling ship's sonar. This led to shift to the LAMPS program of manned helicopters, which the Gearing class were too small to accommodate.

An upgraded version of DASH, QH-50D, remained in use by the United States Army until May 2006.

FRAM I "A" Ships: (First 8 conversions) Removal of aft twin 5-inch gun mount (Mount 53). Group A ships also received two MK10/11 Hedgehogs fitted on each side of the bridge at the 01 level and had the MK-32 triple torpedo launchers aft of the second stack. FRAM I "B" Ships (remainder of conversions): Kept their forward 5-inch mount (Mount 51), lost the second mount (Mount 52) and kept their aft 5-inch mount (Mount 53). In place of mount 52, a practice 5-inch reloading machine was installed with the MK-32 triple torpedo launchers aft of the loader. Group B ships also received greater ASROC and torpedo storage areas next to the port side of the DASH hangar.

FRAM II upgrade 

The FRAM II program was designed primarily for the Allen M. Sumner class destroyer, but sixteen Gearings were upgraded as well. This upgrade program included life-extension refurbishment, a new radar system, Mark 32 torpedo tubes, DASH ASW drone, and variable depth sonar (VDS). Importantly, it did not include ASROC. FRAM II ships included six DDRs and six DDEs that retained their specialized equipment (1960–1961), as well as four DDRs that were converted to DDs and were nearly identical to the Allen M. Sumner class FRAM IIs (1962–1963). The FRAM II ships retained all six 5-inch guns, except the DDEs retained four 5-inch guns and a trainable Hedgehog in the No. 2 position. All FRAM IIs retained two Hedgehogs alongside either the No. 2 5-inch mount or the trainable Hedgehog mount. The four DDRs converted to DDs were armed with two new 21-inch torpedo tubes for the Mk. 37 ASW homing torpedo. Photographs of the six retained DDRs show no markings on the DASH landing deck, as well as a much smaller deckhouse than was usually provided for DASH, so they may not have been equipped with DASH.

Service and disposition 
Many of the Gearings provided significant gunfire support in the Vietnam War. They also served as escorts for Carrier Battle Groups (carrier strike groups from 2004) and Amphibious Ready Groups (Expeditionary Strike Groups from 2006). DASH was withdrawn from ASW service in 1969, due to poor reliability. Lacking ASROC, the FRAM II ships were disposed of in 1969–1974. With ASROC continuing to provide a standoff ASW capability, the Gearing FRAM Is were retained in service for several years, with most being decommissioned and transferred to foreign navies 1973–1980. They were replaced as ASW ships by the s, which were commissioned 1975–1983. These had the same ASW armament as a Gearing FRAM destroyer, with the addition of improved sonar and a piloted helicopter, initially the Kaman SH-2 Seasprite, and from 1984, the Sikorsky SH-60 Seahawk. Some Gearings served in the Naval Reserve Force (NRF) from 1973, remaining in commission with a partial active crew to provide training for Naval reservists.

Yang class 

After the Gearing-class ships were retired from USN service, many were sold abroad, including over a dozen to the Republic of China Navy (ROCN) in Taiwan. These ships, along with Fletcher-class destroyers and Allen M. Sumner-class destroyers also acquired then, were upgraded under the Wu Chin I, II, and III programs and known throughout the ROCN as the Yang-class destroyers as they were assigned names that all end with the word "Yang".  The last batch of 7 WC-III program vessels, all of them Gearing class, were retired in the early 2000s.

Under the most advanced Wu Chin III upgrade program, all World War II vintage weapons were removed and replaced with four Hsiung Feng II surface-to-surface missiles, ten SM-1 (box launchers), one 8-cell ASROC, one  Otobreda gun, two Bofors 40 mm AA, one 20 mm Phalanx CIWS and two triple  torpedo tubes. The DASH ASW drones were not acquired, but hangar facilities aboard those ships that had them were later used to accommodate ASW versions of MD 500 Defender helicopters.

After the Yang-class destroyers were decommissioned, the SM-1 launch boxes were moved to Chi Yang-class frigates to improve their anti-air capability.

Ships in class

Survivors
Five Gearing-class destroyers are preserved as museum ships: two in the United States, one in South Korea, one in Taiwan, and one in Turkey. The ROKS Jeon Buk (DD-916) (formerly the USS Everett F. Larson) was scrapped in December 2021, leaving five survivors out of the ninety eight ships built.

Surviving ships 
  in Fall River, Massachusetts
  in Jacksonville, Florida
 ROCS Te Yang (DDG-925) in Tainan City, Taiwan
 ROKS Jeong Ju (DD-925) in Dangjin, South Korea
 TCG Gayret (D352) in Izmit, Turkey

Surviving parts 

USS Higbee (DD-806), in Naval Station Mayport Dental Clinic, Florida.
ROCS Kai Yang (DDG-924), in August 23 Artillery Battle Museum, Taichung, Taiwan.
ROCS Tze Yang (DDG-930), in Kaohsiung Harbor, Taiwan.
 Quetzalcoatl (E-03), in Mexican Pacific Fleet headquarters, Mexico.

References

External links

NavSource.org Destroyer Photo Gallery index page
Gearing-class destroyers at Destroyer History Foundation
Gearing Class

 

Destroyer classes